Gerard Donck (1600– 1650) was a Dutch Golden Age painter.

Biography
Donck was born and died in Amsterdam.  According to the RKD he produced dated portraits in the years 1627-1640.

Collections
Utah Museum of Fine Arts

References

External links
Gerard Donck on Artnet

1600 births
1650 deaths
Dutch Golden Age painters
Dutch male painters
Painters from Amsterdam